Nistra coelatalis is a snout moth in the family Crambidae. It was described by Francis Walker in 1859. It is found in Sri Lanka, Sumatra, Borneo, Sumbawa and Sulawesi.

The wings are pale yellow with two brown lines. The forewings are partly brownish along the costa with a diffuse purplish tinge in the disc and metallic-purple at the base. The hindwings are metallic-purple at the tips and a metallic-purple patch on each side of the interior angle.

The only species in the genus Nistra, this species was formerly included in Agrotera.

References

Moths described in 1859
Spilomelinae
Moths of Asia